The Adorable Outcast is a 1928 Australian silent film directed by Norman Dawn about an adventurer who romances an island girl. The script was based on Beatrice Grimshaw's novel Conn of the Coral Seas.  It was one of the most expensive films made in Australia until that time, and was Dawn's follow up to For the Term of His Natural Life (1927). It did not perform as well at the box office and helped cause Australasian Films to abandon feature film production.

For the American market, the film was retitled Black Cargoes of the South Seas.

Synopsis
A young adventurer, Stephen Conn (Edmund Burns) is in love with an island girl, Luya (Edith Roberts). An evil blackbirder Fursey (Walter Long) kidnaps Luya to get hands on some gold, but Stephen rescues her with the help of Luya's tribe. When it is revealed that Luya's parents were white, she and Stephen are married.

Cast
Edith Roberts as Luya
Edmund Burns as Stephen Conn
Walter Long as Fursey
Jessica Harcourt as Diedre Rose
John Gavin as Carberry
Katherine Dawn as Elizabeth
Arthur McLaglen as Iron Devil
Arthur Tauchert as Mack
Fred Twitcham as Sir John Blackberry
Compton Coutts as Pooch
William O'Hanlon as pearler
Claude Turton as pearler

Production
The big-budget film was shot mostly on location in Fiji from April to June 1927, with some studio work done at Bondi Junction in Sydney. The three leads, Edith Roberts, Edmund Burns and Walter Long, were all established Hollywood actors. The ambitious filming schedule involved "500 war canoes and outriggers, and 2000 native warriors dancing in full war dress with clubs and spears".

Reception
The film initially performed strongly at the box office but soon tailed off, and expected overseas success did not eventuate. It was estimated the combined losses of this and Norman Dawn's earlier film, For the Term of His Natural Life (1927) came to £30,000.

It was released in the US as Black Cargoes of the South Seas.

Fifteen minutes of the film are in the possession of Australia's National Film and Sound Archive.

References

External links

The Adorable Outcast at National Film and Sound Archive

1928 films
Films from Australasian Films
Australian drama films
Australian silent feature films
Australian black-and-white films
1928 drama films
Films shot in Fiji
Films based on Irish novels
Films set on islands
Films set in Oceania
Films directed by Norman Dawn
Silent drama films
1920s English-language films